Lottery.com (AutoLotto, Inc.) is an online mobile lottery ticket management system for lottery players. The company has created a mobile app that lets users scan and check paper tickets for winnings and, in some states, play Powerball and Mega Millions on their mobile devices.

History

AutoLotto was founded in February 2015 and launched in New Hampshire in June 2016. The Lottery.com app allows users to play the lottery from their smartphone or tablet. By November 2015, the company had raised $2.4 million in seed funding from 500 Startups accelerators and Aurum Partners, an investment firm linked to the San Francisco 49ers.

In July 2017, the mobile lottery service announced its $17 million Series A funding round.

References

External links
 

Lotteries in the United States
Social media